Edwin Ellis may refer to:

Edwin Ellis (poet) (1848–1916), British poet and illustrator
Edwin Ellis (artist) (1842–1895), English artist
Edwin Ellis (musician) (1844–1878), English musician
Edwin E. Ellis (1924–1989), American inventor and photographer
Jack Ellis (rugby league), born Edwin Horace Ellis, New Zealand rugby league player